Basile De Loose (17 December 1809 – 24 October 1885) was a Belgian painter.

He was born in Zele, East Flanders, United Kingdom of the Netherlands, on 17 December 1809, to Johannes Josephus de Loose. Also his father was a painter. Twelve paintings by his father hang in the church of Zele, where also one painting by Basile De Loose is located (The Way of the Cross). He was trained in Antwerp and by 1835 was active in Paris. De Loose was trained by his father, and was also a pupil of Mattheus Ignatius van Bree.

He died in Brussels on 24 October 1885.

Gallery

References

Further reading
 Immerzeel, J.; Immerzeel, C.H., De levens en werken der Hollandsche en Vlaamsche kunstschilders, beeldhouwers, graveurs en bouwmeesters, van het begin der vijftiende eeuw tot heden, Amsterdam: Van Kesteren, 1842-1843
 Bénézit, Emmanuel, Dictionnaire critique et documentaire des peintres, sculpteurs, dessinateurs et graveurs de tous les temps et de tous pays par un groupe d'écrivains spécialistes français et étrangers, Paris: Librairie Grund, 1966
 Eemans, Marc, Biografische woordenboek der Belgische kunstenaars van 1830 tot 1970, vol. 1, p. 144, Brussel: Arto, 1979
 Piron, Paul, De Belgische beeldende kunstenaars uit de 19de en 20ste eeuw,vol. 1, p. 371, Brussel: Art in Belgium, 1999
 Berko, Patrick; Berko, Viviane, Dictionary of Belgian painters born between 1750 & 1875, Brussel: Laconti, 1981
 Flippo, Willem G., Lexicon of the Belgian romantic painters, Antwerpen: International art press, 1981
 I. De Wilde, 'De Loose'. Een 19-eeuws schildergeslacht 1769-1885', Zele 1985
 Cat. tent. Retrospective de Loose, Sint-Niklaas (Stedelijk Museum )1985
 M. van Heteren and J. de Meere, Frederik Marinus Kruseman 1816-1882. Painter of pleasing Landscapes, Schiedam 1998, p. 47, 48, 107

External links

1809 births
1885 deaths
20th-century Belgian painters
People from Zele